Alfonso Carlos de Andrés Asin (16 May 1938 – 5 July 2009) was a Spanish athlete. He competed in the men's javelin throw at the 1960 Summer Olympics.

References

External links
 

1938 births
2009 deaths
Athletes (track and field) at the 1960 Summer Olympics
Spanish male javelin throwers
Olympic athletes of Spain
People from Campo de Borja
Sportspeople from the Province of Zaragoza
Mediterranean Games medalists in athletics
Mediterranean Games silver medalists for Spain
Athletes (track and field) at the 1967 Mediterranean Games